George Forbes, 6th Earl of Granard PC (Ire) (14 June 1760 – 9 June 1837), was an Irish general and peer.

Early life
Forbes was born on 14 June 1760 and was educated at Armagh. He was the eldest son of George Forbes, 5th Earl of Granard, by his first wife, Dorothea Bayly, second daughter of Sir Nicholas Bayly, 2nd Baronet, of the Isle of Anglesea, and great-grandson of Admiral George Forbes, 3rd Earl of Granard.

On succeeding to the title in 1780, the year after his marriage, he made a lengthened tour on the continent. He was introduced to Cardinal Henry Benedict Stuart at Rome, attended one of Frederick the Great's reviews in Silesia, and resided in France and at Vienna.

Career

On his return home he devoted himself to politics, and, following the example of Lord and Lady Moira, adopted liberal opinions, and with his votes and interest steadily supported the policy of Charlemont, Grattan, Curran, and other leaders of the liberal party in Ireland. The Marquis of Buckingham referred to him as the most uncompromising opponent of his administration. Granard was appointed a lieutenant-colonel in the army 17 May 1794, and lieutenant-colonel commandant of the 108th foot, an Irish regiment which he raised in November following. The 108th was disbanded at Gibraltar in 1796. Granard also raised the Longford militia, and commanded it at the battle of Castlebar in 1798, where the regiment, which was said to be disaffected, ran away. Lord Cornwallis wrote in highest praise of Granard's gallantry in endeavouring to rally his regiment. He was also present at Ballinamuck, where the French, under Humbert, surrendered to Cornwallis.

Granard displayed the greatest aversion to the union, an opinion from which none of the inducements then so lavishly offered by the government made him swerve, and he was one of the twenty-one Irish peers who recorded their protest against the measure. Having been deprived of his seat in the House of Lords after the union, he took little part in politics, but devoted himself to the management of his estates, and is said to have been a popular landlord.

During the brief administration of 'All the Talents' in 1806 he was made a peer of the United Kingdom under the title of Baron Granard of Castle Donington, Leicestershire (the seat of his father-in-law), and was also appointed clerk of the crown and hanaper in Ireland, then a most lucrative office. He became a colonel in the army in 1801, major-general in 1808, and lieutenant-general in 1813.

Afterwards, Granard mainly lived in France. He came to England to support both the Roman Catholic Emancipation and Reform Bills, and after the passing of the latter was offered a promotion in the peerage, which he declined, as he had previously refused the order of St. Patrick. He was made full general in July 1830.

Personal life
On 10 May 1779, he married Lady Selina Frances Rawdon, youngest daughter of John Rawdon, 1st Earl of Moira by his third wife, Lady Elizabeth Hastings (the eldest daughter of the ninth Earl of Huntingdon). By this lady, who was sister of the first Marquis of Hastings, Granard had nine children, including:

 Maj.-Gen. Hon. George John Forbes, styled Viscount Forbes (1785–1836), a Whig Member of Parliament for County Longford, Lord Lieutenant of County Longford who married Frances Mary Territt, daughter and heiress of Dr. William Territt of Chilton Hall, in 1832. Frances was a Woman of the Bedchamber to Queen Victoria from 1837 to 1874. After his death, she married Thomas Nugent Vaughan in 1838.
 Hon. Francis Reginald Forbes (1791–1873), who served as Minister Plenipotentiary to Saxony in 1858 and Envoy Extraordinary and Minister Plenipotentiary to Brazil.
 Capt. Hon. Hastings Brudenell Forbes (1793–1815), who was killed at the Battle of Waterloo.
 Hon. Angoulême Moira Forbes (1796–1810), who died young.
 Hon. Ferdinando William Forbes (1801–1802), who died in infancy.
 Lady Elizabeth Maria Theresa Forbes (1786–1852), who married George Parkyns, 2nd Baron Rancliffe, in 1807.
 Lady Selina Francis Forbes (d. 1791)
 Lady Adelaide Dorothea Forbes (d. 1858)
 Lady Caroline Selina Forbes (d. 1872)

He died at his residence, the Hôtel Marbœuf, Champs-Elysées, Paris, on 9 June 1837, at the age of seventy-seven, and was buried in the family resting-place at Newtownforbes, County Longford, Ireland.

Descendants
Through his eldest son George, he was the grandfather of two: George Arthur Hastings Forbes, 7th Earl of Granard, and Capt. Hon. William Francis Forbes DL (1836–1899).

References

External links

1760 births
1837 deaths
18th-century Irish people
19th-century Irish people
British Army generals
People of the Irish Rebellion of 1798
Members of the Privy Council of Ireland
Earls of Granard